Rundle Mall is a pedestrian street mall located in Adelaide, South Australia. It was opened as a pedestrian mall in September 1976 by closing the section of Rundle Street between King William Street and Pulteney Street, to vehicular traffic. The street continues as Rundle Street (as before) to the east and Hindley Street to the west.

The pedestrian mall has become the centrepiece of Adelaide's city centre, home to some of the most expensive real estate in the state. It competes with the large shopping complexes in the suburbs, (e.g. Westfield Marion, Armada Arndale Shopping Centre, Westfield Tea Tree Plaza, etc.) In 2009, retail space directly on the mall leased for up to $3,700 per square metre per year.

The mall is home to the South Australian flagship stores of many large Australian retailers and many smaller independent and chain stores. The mall also features a number of arcades and plazas containing smaller boutiques and eateries. These include the Italianate-style Adelaide Arcade (also being the first retail establishment in Australia with electric lighting, and allegedly home to six ghosts), Regent Arcade, Gay's Arcade, City Cross, Southern Cross, Adelaide Central Plaza, Myer Centre, Renaissance Arcade, and Rundle Place.

There are usually several buskers performing in the mall, licensed by the Adelaide City Council. The mall's stores are generally open seven days a week.

History

Rundle Street
Rundle Street, from which the mall takes its name, is named after John Rundle, a member of the British House of Commons and an original director of the South Australia Company. The street was named on 23 May 1837 by the Street Naming Committee.

In 1895, the first electric street lighting was installed at the intersection of Rundle Street (as it was then), King William Street and Hindley Street, at what is now known as "Beehive Corner".

During the late 19th century, Rundle Street had a tramline run through it, part of a large network of trams in Adelaide. Horse-drawn trams travelled from the Southern Cross Hotel, from King William Street into Rundle Street, past the Kent Town Brewery, with various lines travelling through different routes in the eastern suburbs.

Cinemas

Rex Theatre
The first picture theatre in Rundle Street was the Arcadia Picture Palace, established in a prominent position at no. 127 (at a site now just west of the present Twin Street) in converted shoe store on 2 July 1910. However this modest-looking cinema did not last long, closing on 11 February 1911. A new cinema was designed, reopening as the Pavilion Theatre on 22 June 1912, which became known as "the Pav", reflecting the sign over its entrance. Unusually for its time, the cinema ran films continuously from 11am to 11pm, with audience members allowed to sit for as long as they liked for the price of three pence for a seat in the stalls, or six pence for a seat in the dress circle. It also ran a child-minding service, with "special lady attendants" who looked after children in the circle seats while their mothers went shopping. attendance figures at the Pav were very large. In 1929 the Pavilion Theatre was closed and converted into a mini-golf course. However it was again extensively redeveloped as a cinema, reopening as the Rex Theatre on 31 March 1933.

The  Edwardian façade was not substantially altered, but a new balcony verandah was added, which had access from the circle on warm nights. During the late 1930s, after a change in ownership, the cinema was remodelled in  Art Deco / Moderne style, with an openable roof.  by architect John Kirkpatrick. It had a seating capacity of 1,100 in 1940, and was then well-known as a second-run cinema, usually showing films first shown at the nearby Regent Theatre. In October 1954 a nearby department store, Cox-Foys, bought the theatre, which was still under lease until 1956 by Hoyts. The theatre closed on 12 February 1959. However it was given a new lease of life by Celebrity Theatres Ltd (who ran the Majestic Theatre), who leased it, installed CinemaScope and VistaVision equipment, and reopened it on 15 May 1959.

From 1960 the Rex started screening foreign films, and then new releases from MGM while their  Metro Theatre was showing Ben Hur for 27 weeks. The cinema finally closed on 29 July 1961 and the contents auctioned, before the building was demolished. The Cox-Foys store was extended westwards towards Adelaide Arcade, and continued to operate until 1977. The site was rebuilt to accommodate Kmart in the 2010s, which has office space above it.

Sturt Theatre

Alfred Drake, owner of the Norfolk Arms Hotel, built the Grand Picture Theatre (also known as the Grand Theatre) on the site of the hotel, to the design of architect R. R. G. (Rowland) Assheton, with construction supervised by architect A. J. C. Assheton. It was an elaborate building of five storeys (some of it used as an hotel), with a ticket box of marble, a wide arch at its front entrance, two sliding roofs for ventilation purposes, and a polished cedar staircase. Its opening night for the Lord Mayor of Adelaide (then Isaac Isaacs) and other notable people took place on 30 November 1916, while the public opening took place the following day, when The Fool's Revenge was shown. Drake and his son continued to operate the cinema for many years, earning good profits, and well-known organist Horace Weber played at the theatre.

In the early 1930s, with the advent of "talkies", the theatre underwent refurbishment in Art Deco style, its name was changed to Mayfair Theatre. Having been acquired by British Cinemas Ltd, on its opening night, Good Friday (30 March) 1934, the programme was announced as "British Films for British People". The then Lord Mayor, Jonathan Cain, was present at the opening night. 

The cinema closed in 1976, and underwent conversion into offices, with only the facade remaining of the original building. The building is at 21–23 Rundle Mall.

Regent Theatre

The Regent Theatre, located at 101–107 Rundle Street/Mall, was designed by Cedric Ballantyne of Melbourne, in partnership with Adelaide architects English and Soward, a practice which at that time included Herbert Montefiore Jackman (1897–1968). It was built by J. Reid Tyler, under the personal supervision of cinema filmmaker and entrepreneur F. W. Thring by Hoyts, and opened on 29 June 1928. It was one of the most ornate cinemas and glamorous picture theatres of its time, and originally seated 2,229 people. Its stage was fully equipped to accommodate live performances. Its decorations included Moroccan style details, period Louis XV furniture, and Arabesque filigree on the walls, some of which still remains. There were also tapestries, paintings, statues, and murals. It resembled the Regent Theatre in Sydney. 

Along with the Wondergraph in Hindley Street, the Regent became the first in Adelaide to feature talkies. In 1967 it was reduced in size to cater for dwindling audiences, with the conversion including the creation of the Regent Arcade. When it reopened in May 1968, it seated just 894 people. The theatre's frontage was rebuilt on Grenfell Street. 

Regent Theatre finally closed in 2004 and was incorporated into the arcade. 

In April 2022 the upper level of the cinema opened as a Dymocks bookstore, with its ornate ceiling intact.

Pedestrianisation (1976)
In November 1972, the then South Australian Premier, Don Dunstan, issued the closure of the western part of Rundle Street to create Rundle Mall, due to extreme congestion caused by traffic and the increasing number of pedestrians. It opened on 1 September 1976. Other than police and other government vehicles, drivers need permission to drive on the pedestrian strip. The mall is a dry zone as well as a smoke-free zone.

Upgrades
In 1995−96, the mall received its first major upgrade. The upgrade saw most of the mall's fixtures replaced and the erection of permanent market stalls down the centre of the mall. The market stalls were later demolished as part of a 2013 redevelopment. There were also some escalators in the middle of the Rundle mall in the 1990s, but these were later removed.

In 2013, the Adelaide City Council commenced a $27 million upgrade of the mall that was completed in four stages over a 16-month period. New paving, benches, trees, bins, a multi-purpose structure and ground services were installed. The Rundle Mall master plan also included a catenary lighting system to be supported by four  poles at either end of the mall, using brackets on a number of building facades. In June 2015, it was announced that an additional cost of $3 million was required to complete the lighting system and to undertake further storm water works in the mall. The catenary lighting system for the mall was completed in November 2015 after being delayed by several months.

Notable sites

Rundle Lantern, situated on the south-east corner of Pulteney and Rundle Streets, lights up the eastern end of the Mall at night.

Beehive Corner

Of note is the historic Beehive Corner, completed in 1896. It lies at the western end of the Mall, on the corner of King William Street, and was originally owned by John Rundle. Beehive Corner is built in the Neo-gothic style, which is generally reserved for churches.

Fountain
The Rundle Mall Fountain is one of a pair which formerly stood at the entrance to the Jubilee Exhibition Building on North Terrace between 1887 and 1962 (the other is now located in the Creswell Gardens). When Rundle Mall was being established, the cast-iron fountain. painted in Victorian colours, was relocated to the centre of the intersection of the mall and Gawler Place; it was later moved to the entrance to Adelaide Arcade. The fountain bears a foundry plate showing it was manufactured in England by Andrew Handyside and Company.

Sculptures

"Mall's Balls"
There are several items of modern sculpture in the mall. This is a common meeting place for visitors to the mall. Erected in 1977, they were commissioned by the then Hindmarsh Building Society (subsequently absorbed into the Adelaide Bank) and donated to the City of Adelaide to mark the building society's 1977 centenary.

Pigs
Other sculpture includes a group of life-size bronze pigs − Horatio, Truffles, Augusta and Oliver - rooting around a rubbish bin. South African-born artist Marguerite Derricourt created the bronze sculptures in a national competition instigated by the City of Adelaide.

Cockroach
In 2013, there was giant cockroach statue added to the mall. This statue was salvaged from a junk yard and cleaned up, before being placed in the mall. Police reported two men for dragging the statue six metres along the mall.

Pigeon
The sculpture was commissioned by the City of Adelaide and was completed by South Australian artist Paul Sloan.

Buildings and tenants

The majority of buildings on the Mall contain a small number of retail tenancies. There are also many larger arcades and shopping centres that lead off the Mall or blocks around it. No single company or organisation owns a significant proportion of the Mall's real estate.

Laneways, arcades and plazas
A number of public laneways lead off the mall, such as Gawler Place, James Place, Charles Street, Twin Street, and No Fixed Address Lane. These are home to more retail tenants.

There are a number of arcades and plazas off the mall and its laneways, including:

Adelaide Arcade, with Gay's Arcade leading off it
Adelaide Central Plaza
Charles Street Plaza
 Citi Centre Arcade
City Cross Arcade
Da Costa Arcade (off James Place) 
The Myer Centre
 Parc Arcade
Regent Arcade
Renaissance Arcade
Rundle Mall Plaza
Rundle Place
Rundle Square 
Twin Plaza Arcade (off Twin Street)

Anchor tenants
Major department stores in Rundle Mall are David Jones; Kmart; and Myer. Target is on the opposite side of Pulteney Street. 

Other large tenants:

Apple Store
Coles Supermarkets
Dymocks Bookstore
Harvey Norman
H&M
JB Hi-Fi
Lincraft
Rebel Sport
Uniqlo
Woolworths Supermarkets

Former major tenants:

Amart Sports
Best & Less
Borders
Cox-Foys
Harris Scarfe
Hoyts Cinemas
John Martin's
Radio Rentals
Sanity
Toys "R" Us
Virgin Megastores

Gallery

Footnotes

References

External links
Rundle Mall, Adelaide City Council

1976 establishments in Australia
Busking venues
Culture of South Australia
Pedestrian malls in Australia
Shopping districts and streets in Australia
Shopping malls established in 1976
Streets in Adelaide
Tourist attractions in Adelaide